Superman is a video game programmed by John Dunn for the Atari Video Computer System (later renamed Atari 2600) and released in 1979 by Atari, Inc. The player controls a Superman avatar whose quest is to explore an open-ended environment to find three pieces of a bridge that was destroyed by Lex Luthor, capture Luthor and his criminal gang and then return to the Daily Planet building. The game world is populated by hindrances, such as a helicopter which re-arranges the bridge pieces, and roving kryptonite satellites that cause Superman to revert into Clark Kent.

Atari was owned by Warner Communications who had the license to DC Comics and their Superman characters. Following the financial success of the film Superman (1978), Atari asked programmer Warren Robinett to take the code he was using for Adventure (1980), and to develop the game into one involving Superman. Robinett was not interested, and gave some of the code he developed for Adventure to Dunn. Dunn agreed to Atari's request for a Superman game, if he could have four kilobytes space for the cartridge, opposed to the usual two kilobytes.

Superman was not among the best-selling Atari games, but received positive reviews on its release from the publications Video and The Space Gamer who proclaimed it as one of the best games from Atari noting its high quality graphics and unique gameplay. Some retrospective reviews lamented that the game only used the character of Superman for his more action-oriented abilities while others continued to praise the game's unique gameplay and high quality Atari 2600 graphics.

Gameplay

Superman is a video game where the player controls Clark Kent and superhero alias of Superman. On hearing about a bomb scare in Metropolis, Kent examines the situation and finds Superman's nemesis Lex Luthor leaving the scene as the waterfront bridge explodes. The goal is to repair the bridge which has split into thee parts, capture Luthor, and return to the Daily Planet as Kent in the shortest time possible. To capture a crook or carry Lois Lane and bridge pieces, the player must fly into them and release them by landing. Luthor and his henchmen are placed in jail by flying them into the jail bars while carrying them. Superman can be damaged by kryptonite satellites; if they touch him, he loses his ability to fly and can only be revived by interacting with Lois Lane. A helicopter also moves around Metropolis occasionally moving parts of the bridge around the map.

The game was made prior to the introduction of side-scrolling, leading to the player moving from screen to screen and arriving on the next frame for them to enter a new block of Metropolis. A miniature map consisting of six markers is at the top of the playing field representing city blocks, with the largest marker showing Luthor or one of his henchmen. Each of these areas is connected on four adjoining sides, which can be traversed by flying up, down, left and right through the screens. The player can also traverse through a subway for quicker travel. After entering through a subway door way, travelling upward off screen through different area differentiated by their colors, then exiting by moving off screen left, right or down.

The player can enable Superman's x-ray vision allowing him to see any of the four adjoining frames. While viewing these, Superman cannot move but can still be hit by kryptonite satellites.

Development
In 1976, Warner Communications accuired Atari for $28 million. Warner Communications owned the rights to DC Comics and their characters such as Superman. The market for comics was shrinking during this period and for the first-time, licensing the characters became more profitable, specifically in comparison to the film rentals for the 1978 film Superman. Warner Communications wanted Atari to follow their financially successful film up with a prompt video game tie-in. According to Jessica Aldred in the book Before the Crash, Superman was the first film-licensed game for the Atari VCS, while Ian Bogost and Nick Monfort in their book Chasing the Beam (2009) stated that it was not clear that the game was based on the film. Carl Wilson wrote in The Superhero Multiverse that Mario Puzo's contract had mandated that his story for the Superman film was not to be adapted into any other form as well as finding that the brief plot summary of the game did not relate to any specific Superman comic story running at that period.

While developing the game Adventure (1980) in 1978, Atari asked its designer Warren Robinett to shelve the game and use its design to create a game based on Warner's Superman license. At the time, Robinett had a prototype of the game where the player could move a small square "cursor" from screen to screen picking up colored shapes. Robinett recalled that his actions and similar ones led to executives in the company to call their video game designers "a bunch of high-strung prima donnas". Robinett had passed the job on to John Dunn, who shared code to facilitated the game's development. A business culture clash between Warner and Atari between 1978 and 1979 led to several of the key developers leaving the company as the new managers had realigned Atari to focus on marketing and advertising. According to the game's cover designer, DC Comics were not very hands on in the development of the game and did not give their input or opinions on the game's development.

The game was programmed by Dunn in 1978. Dunn took on the job with the condition that he could develop a game that had a four kilobyte ROM chip on its cartridge. With the exception of Casino (1978) and Hangman (1978), every game made for the Atari VCS had been written within two kilobytes.

For sound and graphics, the Atari 2600 had its Television Interface Adaptor (TIA) which authors Nick Montfort and Ian Bogost described as a programming challenge, allowing for only a relatively small number of unique features. The Atari 2600 did not allow for such services such as graphic rendering, forcing programmers to draw the entirety of each frame of the game's display. The game features no music and only simple sound effects, such as audio getting louder and quieter as Superman flies higher and lower into the air. It was the first video game with multicolored sprites and was among the first console games with a pause feature, following the Fairchild Channel F system.

Release
In Atari's The Atari Video Computer System Catalog from 1979, the game was listed as being available soon. Betsy Staples wrote in September 1979 in Creative Computing about playing the game at an Electronic expo, while promotional material in newspapers stated the game as arriving soon on September 13, 1979, and then being available in stock on September 28, 1979. A review in The Space Gamer also stated the game was released in the third quarter of 1979.

The cover art for Superman was drawn by Judy Richter. According to Richter, DC gave them a playbook on exactly how Superman should look as the cover art was going to be crucial as that is what people would see on the store shelves.

Reception
Kent found that though Superman video games were generally considered disappointing, Atari's Superman was "the best-reviewed game of the lot." From contemporary reviews, Bill Kunkel and Arnie Katz reviewed Superman in Video, and declared it as a game that "ushers in an exciting new era for home arcades [...] put simply, there's no game remotely similar to this one." citing that its place in a Video Arcade Hall of Fame "seems assured." Video established its Arcade Awards, nicknamed the Arkies, to recognize "outstanding achievements in the field of electronic gaming." and had their 1981 edition acknowledge the year's games. Superman was listed as their "Game of the Year" declaring it a single-player masterpiece and "the most important release" of the year. Norman Howe wrote in The Space Gamer commented that he the found gameplay unusual, finding that moving the character to the edge of the screen to progress to a new area was "unusual". Howe proclaimed that the multiple tasks and quick travel systems made it "a fascinating challenge" with "excellent graphics" declaring it "the best Atari game I have yet seen." Among the weak points, Howe noted that it was possible to lose items near the edge of the frame and that the game had a high cost for a single-scenario game. Another review from Electronic Games, from the "1983 Software Encyclopedia" issue, gave the game a nine out of ten rating, declaring the gameplay, graphics and sound as "excellent" and that it was "outstanding" as a single-player game.

Bogost and Monfort found that game had "expunged the movie's social and emotional relationships - and those of the comic books - choosing action sequences instead. Games licensed from movies have continued to follow this early VCS game in this regard." Just McElroy of Polygon declared in his article titled "A Brief History of Crappy Superman Games" that Superman kissing Lois Lane to make him regain his powers was "kind of gross". William Wilson of Forbes stated in 2015 that by contemporary standards [Superman] was "nothing to shake a stick at" while noting that viewed from its era of gaming and the hardware of the period the game was "pretty groundbreaking" noting its graphics being better than some of the competition, specifically comparing it to Atari's Adventure. Skyler Miller of AllGame gave the game a five out of five star rating, praising the game's re-playability, graphics, but found it not up to the standards of the games developed for the system by Activision, and that the game was filled with small touches that really made it special such as the sound of flying decreasing in volume as you went higher and Lois Lane lifting her leg when Superman kisses her.

Aldred stated that Superman was a "middling success" which led to a relative dearth of film-licensed titles until 1981. Superman was the first published superhero to feature in a video game, only later followed up on the Atari 2600 by Spider-Man (1982). Following the video game crash of 1983, Warner Communications was without any video game subsidiary as they had divided and sold Atari. Once the video game market began to recover, Warner Communications began licensing out their DC Comics properties to third-party developers. The next game featuring Superman would appear in 1985 with Superman: The Game by First Star Software for the Commodore 64.

See also

 1979 in video games
 List of Atari 2600 games

References

Sources

External links 
 Superman at AtariAge
 Superman manual at the Internet Archive
 Superman at Atari Mania

1979 video games
Adventure games
Atari 2600 games
Atari 2600-only games
Atari games
Superman video games
Video games developed in the United States
Video games set in the United States
Single-player video games